Estradiol/norethisterone acetate (E2/NETA), sold under the brand name Activella among others, is a combination of estradiol (E2) and norethisterone acetate (NETA) which is used in the treatment of vasomotor symptoms, vulvar and vaginal atrophy, and osteoporosis associated with menopause. Activella specifically is marketed by Novo Nordisk and is supplied as film-coated tablets containing 1 mg estradiol and 0.5 mg norethisterone acetate. CombiPatch is a combination of estradiol and NETA provided as a transdermal patch.

See also 
 Ethinylestradiol/norethisterone acetate
 Ethinylestradiol/norelgestromin
 Estradiol/levonorgestrel
 List of combined sex-hormonal preparations

References 

Combined estrogen–progestogen formulations
Transdermal patches